The Abia State Ministry of Commerce and Industry is one of the branches of the Abia State Government. The body aims to create opportunities for a stable and sustainable economic growth by promoting private sector development in its free market economy.

See also
Abia State Government

References

Government ministries of Abia State
Abia
Abia